The British Rail Class 159 is a class of British diesel multiple unit passenger trains of the Sprinter family, built in 1989–1992 by British Rail Engineering Limited (BREL)'s Derby Litchurch Lane Works as Class 158. Before entering traffic, the original 22 units were modified at Rosyth Dockyard to Class 159 to operate services from London Waterloo to Salisbury and Exeter St Davids, replacing various locomotive-hauled passenger trains.

The units were originally branded by Network SouthEast as South Western Turbo.

History and design

In the late 1980s, the locomotive-hauled stock on Network SouthEast's West of England route from London Waterloo to Salisbury, Yeovil Junction and Exeter St Davids was in urgent need of replacement. The Class 50 locomotives were not suited to the stop-start nature of the route, and frequently broke down. Because of the long sections of single track west of Salisbury following the Beeching cuts, a single breakdown could cause chaos. Various options were considered including electrification, shortened HSTs, construction of new locomotives and stock (a passenger version of the proposed Class 48), or the proposed Class 171 (which would have been part of the Networker family, an intercity version of the Class 165 – not to be confused with the later Turbostars). A study found the best options were electrification or new DMUs.

With the UK economy in decline in the early 1990s, it was found that Regional Railways had over-ordered Class 158s at the same time as Network SouthEast was looking for a similar number of new diesel trains. NSE agreed to take on the surplus Class 158s.

The original 22 units were built as Class 158 units, but were rebuilt by Babcock Rail in Rosyth Dockyard before entering traffic. This entailed fitting first-class accommodation and retention toilets, and various other modifications. The rebuild was required because it was not possible for Network SouthEast and the newly privatised BREL to agree terms on the variation order to NSE specification.

The first unit (159004) was handed over to NSE on 6 January 1993.

The units converted to Class 159 specification during construction are numbered 159001–159022, with individual vehicles numbered 52873–52894 and 57873–57894 for driving motor vehicles, and 58718–58739 for intermediate motor vehicles. The entire class is maintained at a purpose-built depot at Salisbury.

In 2007, eight further Class 159 units were created through the rebuilding of surplus Class 158 units displaced from TransPennine Express.

The units feature BSI couplers. This enables them to work in multiple not only with other units from the same class, but also  and the classes of the Pacer and Sprinter families.

Accidents and incidents
Nine people were injured.
On 31 October 2021, South Western Railway Class 159 unit 159102 collided with a Great Western Railway Class 158 train at Fisherton tunnel in Salisbury.

Operations

The units were dedicated to the West of England sector of Network South East, operating services between London Waterloo and Exeter; they also worked services between Salisbury and Southampton and on the Reading to Basingstoke line, replacing elderly DEMUs. They then transferred to the South West Trains shadow franchise in readiness for privatisation.

Upon the privatisation of British Rail, the West of England route passed in 1996 to the South West Trains franchise, which was won by the Stagecoach Group. Starting in 2000, units were progressively refurbished and repainted from Network SouthEast's blue, red and white livery into South West Trains' express livery. Other post-privatisation modifications included clearer LED destination displays, upgraded air-conditioning, and more openable windows.

Currently, the Class 159s operate mainly from London Waterloo to Salisbury/Exeter in formations of six, eight, or nine coaches (2 × Class 159, 2 × 159 plus 1 × 158, or 3 × 159 respectively) and between Salisbury and Exeter in three- or six-coach formations. Until the December 2009 timetable change, some trains continued beyond Exeter to Paignton, Plymouth and Penzance; these usually operated as three-coach units, though at weekends there were some six-coach formations. These services are now operated by the Great Western Railway. The service to Bristol Temple Meads is now also in the hands of Class 159s.

Since 2006, the original Class 159 fleet of 22 has been supplemented by eight three-coach 158s (renumbered into the 159/1 series) and 11 two-coach Class 158s. The decision to standardise on 158s and 159s allowed the nine Class 170 'Turbostar' units to be transferred to other operators. Eight went to First TransPennine Express, with the remaining unit going to Southern for integration into Class 171 Turbostars.

Refurbishments and conversions

Refurbishment of the Class 159/0

2000
South West Trains began a refurbishment programme for its 22 Class 159/0s in 2000. The seats were re-trimmed and interiors repainted. The units were repainted into SWT livery.

2008
The units received another refurbishment in 2008 at Wabtec Doncaster. CCTV and PIS (Passenger Information Systems) were installed, new seating was installed in first class and at the same time the units received a modified version of the SWT express livery (with orange doors as opposed to the red doors on Class 444 units) for compliance with disabled access regulations.

Class 158 conversions

Eight of TransPennine's surplus three-coach Class 158 units were refurbished to match SWT's existing Class 159 units at Wabtec Doncaster, and renumbered into Class 159 subclass /1. The first updated units were delivered to South West Trains in November 2006, and by May 2007 all of the new subclass were in service.

The refurbishment included making the first-class accommodation area larger and completely refitting it, brighter interior lighting with new diffusers and the plating-over of the disused toilet in the MSO vehicle. The Class 159/1s have been fitted with retention toilets. Additional alterations include the installation of a Passenger information system (PIS) and CCTV as is fitted on the 159/0s.

The converted units however retained their original Cummins NTA855-R1 engines, which produce  less power than the R3 variants fitted to the Class 159/0 fleet.

Fleet details

Liveries

Routes Served
These trains serve the following routes:

London Waterloo to Basingstoke, Salisbury and Exeter St Davids via Yeovil Junction
London Waterloo & Salisbury to Yeovil Pen Mill (Via Westbury or Yeovil Junction)

Notes

References

External links

159
159
Train-related introductions in 1993